Church of St. Luke, is an Anglican church in Isfahan, Iran. It is located in Abbasabad neighbourhood of Isfahan, next to Isfahan Christian Mission Hospital (fa).

History 

Church Missionary Society (CMS) was active in Persia from 1869, when the Revd. Robert Bruce established a mission station in New Julfa.  In 1909, the Church of St. Luke was consecrated in Isfahan.  It is currently one of four active Anglican churches in Iran, the others are St. Paul Church in Tehran, St. Simon the Zealot Church in Shiraz and St. Paul Church in New Julfa.

See also
Christianity in Iran
Anglican Diocese of Iran
Edward Stuart

References 

Buildings and structures in Isfahan
Churches in Isfahan
Churches in Iran
Anglicanism in Iran